ShelleyDevoto was a musical collaboration between singer Howard Devoto and singer/guitarist Pete Shelley. Both were founding members of the Buzzcocks in the mid-1970s, and ShelleyDevoto was their first collaboration in over two decades. 

The album Buzzkunst was released in 2001 on Cooking Vinyl, along with one single/video, "Til the Stars in His Eyes Are Dead". The vocals and lyrics, primarily by Devoto, remain reminiscent of his post-Buzzcocks bands Magazine and Luxuria. The music, however, is something of a departure for both men, blending Shelley's trademark rough-yet-melodic guitar with electronica. The album was recorded, journalist Paul Lester told readers of the London Guardian, 'in the duo's homes in London using basic technology.'  Reviews were mixed but mostly positive, with a 70% ranking on MetaCritic.

Some sources incorrectly refer to the band by the name of the album Buzzkunst - due to the similarity to 'Buzzcocks'.

References

External links
Label page 

English rock music groups
English musical duos
Male musical duos
Rock music duos
Musical collaborations